Humphries Brook is a river in Delaware County, New York. It flows into Somerset Lake from the west, then exits the lake and flows south before converging with the Delaware River in Lordville.

References

Rivers of New York (state)
Rivers of Delaware County, New York